Razor Entertainment Group (colloquially as Razor), founded in 2005, was a private company that produced trading cards and collectibles. Based in Dallas, Texas, it was best known as a producer of baseball cards and other lithographic products.

Company history
The company was founded in 2005 by Brian Gray in Dallas, Texas.

On July 9, 2008 Razor signed the number one 2008 MLB draft pick, Tim Beckham to an exclusive deal.

In 2010, Gray acquired the rights to the Leaf brand name.  Razor was immediately shuttered, and Gray re-launched "Leaf Trading Cards."  Leaf continues to produce many of the same kinds of trading card products Razor had made.

Products

Baseball
 2008 Signature Series
 2008 Razor Letterman Baseball

Cut Signature
 2009 Cut Signature Historical Heroes Edition
 2009 Cut Signature Sports Icons
 2008 Cut Signature Oval Office Edition - Self-proclaimed "the most expensive pack of all time", at an average $2,500 retail-value, it contained 1 card per pack and 1 pack per box. The product came in wooden collector's box numbered to 99 and every card is a 1/1 card encapsulated in a Beckett holder. 
 2008 Razor Cut Signature Edition
 2008 Razor Cut Signature Edition

See also

Baseball card
Beckett Media
Donruss
Fleer
Leaf Trading Cards
Topps
Topps baseball card products
Upper Deck

References

Manufacturing companies based in Texas
Trading card companies
Manufacturing companies established in 2005
Manufacturing companies disestablished in 2010
Companies based in Dallas